Juichi Nagatani (born 27 January 1903 – 2 February 1953) was a Japanese long-distance runner. He competed in the marathon at the 1928 Summer Olympics.

References

1903 births
1953 deaths
Place of birth missing
Japanese male long-distance runners
Japanese male marathon runners
Olympic male long-distance runners
Olympic male marathon runners
Olympic athletes of Japan
Athletes (track and field) at the 1928 Summer Olympics
Japan Championships in Athletics winners